Demyan Chubatyi (born 16 March 2004) is a professional Ukrainian football defender who plays for FC Oleksandriya.

Career
Born in Ovruch, Chubatyi is a product of the local Ovruch youth sportive school and Dynamo Kyiv youth sportive system.

In July 2021 he signed a contract with the Ukrainian Premier League club FC Oleksandriya and made his debut for this side as the second half-time substituted player in the away winning match against FC Metalist 1925 Kharkiv on 26 October 2021 in the Round of 16 of the Ukrainian Cup.

References

External links 
Statistics at UAF website (Ukr)

2004 births
Living people
People from Ovruch
Ukrainian footballers
FC Dynamo Kyiv players
FC Oleksandriya players
Association football defenders
Sportspeople from Zhytomyr Oblast